The royal consorts of Ethiopia were spouses of the monarchs of Ethiopia. In ancient times the territory of modern day Ethiopia included the Kingdom of Axum. In medieval times, a kingdom ruled by the Zagwe dynasty developed but was later deposed by the Solomonic dynasty, who would establish the Ethiopian Empire. The following list includes known consorts from the Axumite period to the abolition of the Ethiopian monarchy in 1975.

Axumite period (c. 100 – c. 960)

Zagwe dynasty (c. 960 or 1137 – 1270)
The following table is likely incomplete.

Solomonic dynasty

Pre-Gondarine period (1270 – 1682)
The following table is likely incomplete.

Gondarine period (1682 – 1769)
The following table is likely incomplete.

Era of the Princes (1769 – 1855)
The following table is likely incomplete.

Modern Ethiopia (1855 – 1975)

See also
 List of emperors of Ethiopia
 List of legendary monarchs of Ethiopia

Notes

References

Royal consorts
Ethiopian Royal Family
Empresses and imperial consorts of Ethiopia
Ethiopia
Women of medieval Ethiopia